2023 International Horticultural Exposition or Expo 2023 is an International Horticultural Expo to be hosted by Doha, Qatar. The Horticultural Expo 2023 Doha will begin on October 2, 2023 and conclude on March 28, 2024. Originally scheduled to be held from 14 October 2021 to 17 March 2022, but it was rescheduled to 2023 due to the COVID-19 pandemic. The Bureau International des Expositions (BIE) general assembly in Paris formally recognised it on 22 November 2018 as an International Horticultural Exhibition.  The Expo will be organized under the theme "Green Desert, Better Environment". An  site has been identified.

Rescheduling
The organisers approached the BIE to move the opening to 2023, following the delay of Expo 2020 from 2020 to 2021 and a request to do so by the AIPH, and agreement from the government of Qatar. The request was in recognition of challenges facing participating countries during the COVID-19 pandemic.

The BIE's executive committee agreed this rescheduling in principle, meaning that it could be put a vote at the next general assembly on 1 December 2020.

At the general assembly it was agreed that the exposition be held between 2 October 2023 and 28 March 2024, and be called International Horticultural Expo 2023 Doha Qatar during which the country would focus on hosting the FIFA World Cup the year before.

References

World's fairs in Asia
Events in Doha
2023 in Asia
2024 in Asia
Events postponed due to the COVID-19 pandemic